Deh-e Alishah (also Romanized as Deh-e ‘Alīshāh) is a village in Qorqori Rural District, Qorqori District, Hirmand County, Sistan and Baluchestan Province, Iran. At the 2006 census, its population was 73, in 12 families.

References 

Populated places in Hirmand County